Need for Speed: Porsche Unleashed, released as Need for Speed: Porsche 2000 in Europe and Need for Speed: Porsche in Latin America and Germany, is a racing video game released in 2000. It is the fifth installment in the Need for Speed series. Unlike other NFS titles, Porsche Unleashed centers on racing Porsche sports cars, with models ranging from 1950 to 2000. Unlike the previous four Need for Speed games, Porsche Unleashed was not released in Japan.

Gameplay 

Need for Speed: Porsche Unleashed gives the player the opportunity to race Porsche cars (including 3 race cars) throughout a range of tracks located in Europe. There are two career modes, an evolution mode, where the player starts with Porsche cars made in 1950 with the first 356 and ends with Porsche cars made in 2000 with the 996 and factory driver mode, where the player goes through a series of events like slalom, stunts, and races, using Porsche cars preselected for each event. The player can customize their cars drawing from an in-depth catalog of different Porsche as well as aftermarket parts. Unlike previous games in the series, there are no pursuit modes in the Windows version. Some factory driver events include police cars, but the police cars only attempt to impede the players car during certain sprint events. In the PlayStation version, there is an exclusive chase mode where the player has to outrun a pursuing police car until a timer runs out. In splitscreen multiplayer, a second player can take control of the police car and attempt to catch the other player.

The factory driver mode introduces the first storyline in the Need For Speed series. The player's goal is to become a Porsche factory driver by completing a series of events. The game uses pop-up windows, each with an image of an existing Porsche factory team member, and text describing the next event, and also commenting on the player's progress. In some cases, a timed course such as a slalom notes the required time to pass, but also mentions the current team record, where beating the record is optional and the post event pop-up will note if the player set a new record or not. The events involve stunts, like doing two 180 degree spins (the first one leaves the players car driving backwards for a bit), slalom courses, delivery (time limited sprints with police that interfere with the player's car), normal sprint and circuit races.

Need for Speed: Top Speed
An additional online-only conversion of Porsche Unleashed, dubbed Need for Speed: Top Speed, was released in response to both the release of MacGillivray Freeman's 2002 IMAX film, Top Speed, and the Porsche Cayenne. The game features three existing tracks from Porsche Unleashed and three Porsche vehicles: the 911 (996) Turbo, the 959 and the Cayenne Turbo.

Access to Need for Speed: Top Speed was bundled alongside the PC version of Need for Speed: Hot Pursuit 2.

40 Jahre 911 Bundle 

The 40 Jahre 911 Bundle was released on November 13, 2003 and was only available in Germany. It was a special 40th anniversary edition for the Porsche 911.

The CD box is packed in a unique metal box with the game itself patched to version 3.4. Also included is the official soundtrack of the game, although no additional game features were included.

Reception

The PlayStation version received "generally favorable reviews", while the Game Boy Advance version received "mixed" reviews, according to the review aggregation website Metacritic. Doug Trueman of NextGen gave a lukewarm review of the PC version. In the UK, Official UK PlayStation Magazine gave the PS version eight out of ten and liked its structure, but said that many of the 70 cars were indistinguishable, and criticised the lifespan. They described the handling as "arcadey", and warned people who didn't like Porsches to "steer well clear". The D-Pad Destroyer was positive to the PlayStation version and praised the manufacturer license of Porsche cars as an innovation for the series. Thomas Crymes called the PC version as "entertaining and refined racer".

PC Gamer US named the PC version the best racing game of 2000. It also won the award for "Driving Game of the Year" at GameSpots Best and Worst of 2000 Awards. It was a runner-up for "Racing" at Computer Gaming Worlds 2001 Premier Awards, which went to Motocross Madness 2. It was also a runner-up for the "PC Simulation of the Year" award at the Academy of Interactive Arts & Sciences' Fourth Interactive Achievement Awards, which went to MechWarrior 4: Vengeance. The staff of Computer Games Magazine nominated it for their 2000 "Racing Game of the Year" award, whose winner remains unknown. It was also nominated for the Racing Game of the Year award at the CNET Gamecenter Computer Game Awards for 2000, whose winner was unfortunately lost to time. The PlayStation version was a runner-up for the "Racing Game of 2000" award in Readers' Choice at IGNs Best of 2000 Awards for PlayStation.

The PC version sold 74,795 units in the U.S. by the end of 2000. This accounted for $2.58 million in revenue. Domestic sales rose to 340,000 units, for revenues of $6.3 million, by August 2006. At the time, this led Edge to declare it the country's 52nd-best-selling computer game released since January 2000.

In the German market, the game debuted at #4 on Media Control's computer game sales rankings for March 2000. Securing fifth place the following month, it proceeded to remain in the top 20 through June, before dropping to 27th in July and 39th in August. Sales in the region totaled roughly 65,000 units by late 2000, a figure with which Electronic Arts was "not dissatisfied", according to PC Players Udo Hoffman. However, he noted that the title had underperformed compared to its predecessors, and was part of a downturn in computer game sales that year.

Notes

References

External links
 
 

2000 video games
Destination Software games
Eden Games games
Electronic Arts games
Game Boy Advance games
Multiplayer and single-player video games
 05
PlayStation (console) games
Porsche
Video games about police officers
Video games developed in Canada
Video games developed in France
Video games scored by Rom Di Prisco
Video games scored by Saki Kaskas
Video games set in France
Video games set in Germany
Video games set in Monaco
Windows games